"Allergic" is a song by American rapper and singer Post Malone. It was sent to alternative radio as the fifth single from Post Malone's third studio album, Hollywood's Bleeding on September 24, 2019. The song was written by Malone alongside Billy Walsh and producers Louis Bell and Brian Lee.

The song peaked at number 37 on the US Billboard Hot 100.

Critical reception
In a positive review, Max Sea from GQ called the song his favorite off the album, stating that all of the track's sporadic elements manage to work just right. Will Schube from Billboard ranked the song 14th, out of the 17 tracks on the album, in terms of the best to worst tracks, criticizing the lack of depthness in the song's lyrics.

Personnel
Credits adapted from Tidal.

 Post Malone – principal vocalist, songwriting
 Brian Lee – production, programming, songwriting
 Louis Bell – production, recording, vocal production, programming, songwriting
 Kelsey Silva
 Billy Walsh – songwriting
 Simon Todkill – recording
 Manny Marroquin – mixing
 Chris Galland – mixing assistant
 Robin Florent – mixing assistant
 Scott Desmarais – mixing assistant
 Jeremie Inhaber – mixing assistant

Charts

Certifications

Release history

References

External links

2019 songs
2019 singles
Post Malone songs
Songs written by Louis Bell
Songs written by Post Malone
Songs written by Brian Lee (songwriter)
Song recordings produced by Louis Bell
Republic Records singles
American indie rock songs
American pop punk songs